Killer Lords is a compilation album by the English/American rock band The Lords of the New Church, released in 1985 by Illegal/I.R.S. It features material from their three studio albums, two previously unreleased songs and a non-album single. The album peaked at #22 on the UK Indie Chart.

Background 

Killer Lords includes two previously unreleased tracks, "Lord's Prayer" and a cover of Creedence Clearwater Revival's "Hey Tonight". The songs were originally recorded for a planned single release that never materialized. "Lord's Prayer" was written by T. V. Smith of the Adverts, who offered the song to the Lords of the New Church. "He just came to us and said, "I've got a song for you blokes", explained guitarist Brian James. The two songs were produced by Steven Van Zandt in London. "l'd already known Steven for two or three years," singer Stiv Bators said in 1985. "And then the last time the Lords were in New York, he came to one of our gigs and did the encore with us." Afterwards, Van Zandt was told that the concert had been recorded for a possible live album. "We met up a couple of days later and hung out and he says 'I wanna produce the live album'," Bators said. However, the live album was subsequently abandoned by the band's manager and label boss, Miles Copeland. As a result of the changes of plan, Van Zandt selected instead to produce the planned single.

When asked what prompted the band to record their infamous and amusing version of Madonna’s "Like A Virgin", which had been released as a single in 1985, Brian James recalled: "That was Miles' idea. It got nothing to do with us at all. We saw him in the office one day and he said, "I got this great idea." Copeland then sent Bators and James to William Orbit's Guerilla Studios in London to record the song. James: "And it's like, "Right, here's the backing track, now put some guitar on it". Bators was having some difficulty with his vocal arrangement, so he turned to his friend, Michael Monroe from Hanoi Rocks, for help. "Michael came into the studio with me and we stayed there for about 12 hours getting the hang of it," recalled Bators. "And it was Michael who guided me through it. I ended up doing things I'd never even thought of, hitting notes I didn't know I could hit." The single subsequently gained the band some attention and radio airplay, taking it to #2 on the UK Indie Chart.

Critical reception 

Gary Hill of AllMusic gave the album 4½ stars out of 5 and wrote: "Some of this material will definitely be objectionable to certain listeners, but to fans of the group, or of the early goth sound in general, this release is definitely a treat."

Track listing 
Adapted from the album's liner notes.

Chart positions

Personnel 
Credits adapted from the album's liner notes.
The Lords of the New Church

Stiv Bators – vocals
Brian James – guitar
Dave Tregunna – bass, vocals
Nick Turner – drums, percussion, vocals

Technical

The Lords of the New Church – production (1, 3, 5, 8, 11-16, 18, 19)
Chris Tsangarides – production (4, 7, 9, 17)  
Steven Van Zandt – production (2, 10) 
Todd Rundgren – production (6)
Lincoln Fong – production (12)  
Pete Hammond – remix (1)
John Guarnieri – preparation, compilation for CD release
Doug Schwartz – digital remastering

References 

1985 compilation albums
The Lords of the New Church albums
Illegal Records albums
I.R.S. Records albums
Albums produced by Chris Tsangarides
Albums produced by Todd Rundgren
Albums produced by Steven Van Zandt